Kuntur Sinqa (Quechua kuntur condor, sinqa nose, "condor nose", also spelled Condor Sencca, Condor-Sencca, Condor Senja, Condor Sincca, Condorcencca, Condorcinca, Condorsencca, Condorsenga, Condorsenja, Condorsincca, Condorsinja, Condorsenqa, Cóndorsencca) may refer to:

Mountain
 Kuntur Sinqa (Ancash), in the Ancash Region, Peru
 Kuntur Sinqa (Ayacucho), in the Ayacucho Region, Peru
 Kuntur Sinqa (Jauja), in the Jauja Province, Junín Region, Peru
 Kuntur Sinqa (Junín), in the Tarma Province, Junín Region, Peru
 Kuntur Sinqa (Lima), in the Lima Region, Peru
 Kuntur Sinqa (Paruro), in the Paruro Province, Cusco Region, Peru
 Kuntur Sinqa (Quispicanchi), in the Quispicanchi Province, Cusco Region, Peru

Places 
 Kuntur Sinqa (La Convención), a viewpoint at a mountain in the Cusco Region, Peru